Racho Petrov Stoyanov (3 March 1861 – 22 January 1942) was a leading Bulgarian general and politician.

Petrov was born in Shumen.  A talented soldier, he was appointed Chief of General Staff at the age of 24 and was Minister of Defence at 27. His stature was increased by the leading role he took in suppressing an army mutiny in 1887. He married Sultana Pantaleeva Minchovich in 1887, with  whom he had 3 children. After an unhappy marriage, they divorced in 1919.

Both Petrov and his wife were personally close to Tsar Ferdinand I of Bulgaria and in 1891 he was promoted by Ferdinand to the rank of colonel, the first officer to hold that rank in Bulgaria. Petrov also attended Ferdinand's wedding to Princess Marie Louise of Bourbon-Parma in Italy in 1893. Ferdinand's decision in 1894 to place Petrov in charge of the army completely, and thus outside the command of Prime Minister Stefan Stambolov, precipitated the resignation of the latter.

As a politician, he twice served as Prime Minister of Bulgaria, initially as the non-party head of an interim administration in 1901, the only task of which was to organize the next election. He returned as Prime Minister for a longer period from 1903–1906, having been appointed for fear of war after a Bulgarian insurrection in Ottoman Macedonia. His government was particularly concerned with military matters and oversaw an armament program and extensive modernization of the Bulgarian army.

During the Second Balkan War Petrov, by then a Lieutenant General, took command of the 3rd Army, leading it at the Battle of Bregalnica, a Serbian victory.

During the First World War he served as head of the newly established Macedonian Military Inspection Oblast from December 1915 until October 1916.

See also
List of Bulgarian generals in the Kingdom of Bulgaria

Notes

 

1861 births
1942 deaths
People from Shumen
Bulgarian generals
Prime Ministers of Bulgaria
Government ministers of Bulgaria
Members of the National Assembly (Bulgaria)
Bulgarian military personnel of the Balkan Wars
Bulgarian military personnel of World War I
People of the Serbo-Bulgarian War
Bulgarian cartographers
Recipients of the Order of Bravery
Recipients of the Order of the Medjidie, 1st class
Recipients of the Order of St. Anna, 1st class
Recipients of the Order of the Cross of Takovo
Topographers
19th-century Bulgarian military personnel
20th-century Bulgarian military personnel
Defence ministers of Bulgaria
Foreign ministers of Bulgaria